Anna Amalia of Baden-Durlach (born: 9 July 1595; died: 18 November 1651 in Saarbrücken) was a Countess of Nassau-Saarbrücken by marriage to William Louis, Count of Nassau-Saarbrücken, and regent of Nassau-Saarbrücken during the minority of her son from 1640.

Life
She was a daughter of Margrave George Frederick of Baden-Durlach and his first wife, Countess Juliana Ursula of Salm-Neuville.  She married in 1615 Count William Louis of Nassau-Saarbrücken.

Her children were legally minors when her husband died in 1640.  She took up the regency, until her death.  After her death, John Louis acted as regent for Gustav Adolph and Walrad until the inheritance was divided when they came of age in 1659.

Issue
She had the following children:
 Anna Juliana (1617–1667), married Count Palatine Frederick of Zweibrücken
 Maurice
 Charlotte (1619–1687), married Louis Everhard of Leiningen-Westerburg
 Crato (1621–1642), succeeded William Louis as Count of Nassau-Saarbrücken; died in battle at Straelen
 Anna Amalia (1623–1695)
 John Louis (1625–1690), married in 1649 Countess Palatine Dorothea Catherine of Birkenfeld-Bischweiler
 Elisabeth Sybilla (1626–1627)
 Maria Sybilla (1628–1699), married August Philipp, Duke of Schleswig-Holstein-Sonderburg-Beck
 George Frederick (1630-1630)
 Gustav Adolph (1632–1677), married in 1662 Eleonora Clara of Hohenlohe-Neuenstein
 George Frederick (1633–1635)
 Walrad (1635–1702), married in 1678 Catherine Françoise of Croÿ-Roeulx

House of Zähringen
House of Nassau
Margravines of Baden
Countesses of Nassau
Regents of Germany
1595 births
1651 deaths
17th-century German people
17th-century women rulers
Daughters of monarchs